The 1983–84 Women's IHF Cup was the third edition of the competition, taking place from 1983 to 1 April 1984. 12 teams took part in it, with the absence of six countries that contested the previous edition including finalists Soviet Union and East Germany, so the Round of 16 was suppressed. 
On the other hand, Luxembourg made its debut. Chimistul Ramnicu Vâlcea became the first Romanian club to win the trophy by beating VfL Oldenburg, which was the first team from Western Europe to reach the final.

Qualifying round

Quarter-finals

Semifinals

Final

References

Women's EHF Cup
1983 in handball
1984 in handball